Baiyang Lake, also known as Lake Baiyangdian, is located in the Xiong'an New Area of Baoding, a prefecture-level city in Hebei Province, China. It is the largest freshwater lake in northern China. It is referred to as the Kidney of North China.

Environment
Baiyang Lake brings together nine of the upper reaches of the river water.

The lake is home to about 50 varieties of fish and multiple varieties of wild geese, duck, and birds. The lake and side parks also are home to a vast number of lotus, reed and other plants. From harvesting the fauna and flora of the lake, the locals make a living.

Due to drought and over-exploitation of groundwater, as well as problems of industrial wastewater since the 1980s, faced with the test of water shortages and pollution of ecological problems to Baiyang lake, the city government of Baoding plans to solve this problem in ten years at a cost of 8 billion Yuan (year 2006).

Tourism
Baiyang Lake is about two hours by bullet train from Beijing.It is a national and international tourist attraction flaunting its peaceful water scenes and vast lotus gardens. Hand-driven and motorized boats are available for small to medium-sized groups; large motorized boats are available for large groups usually accompanied by a tour guide. Tourists can travel by boat into waters full of lotuses and pick seeds, leaves, and flowers. They can also stop by boats or islands and buy local seafood. It is classified as a AAAAA scenic area by the China National Tourism Administration. Islands on the lake host local restaurants that cook with local ingredients and hotels for the overnight tourist.

In Literature
Baiyangdian is the setting for one of the classics in Chinese children's literature Little Soldier Zhang Ga by Xu Guangyao.

References

Bodies of water of Hebei
Lakes of China
AAAAA-rated tourist attractions